The Coalition for the Defense of Sharia, which is also known as the Get United Coalition, and the Islamic Sharia Application Coalition is an Islamist political alliance in Egypt designed to ensure the development of a constitution that is compatible with Sharia. The coalition reportedly includes 30 political parties and movements altogether. Another article by the Egypt Independent states that there are 13 parties and groups involved.

Affiliated parties 
 Freedom and Justice Party
 Al Nour Party
 Safety and Development Party
 Building and Development Party
 Authenticity Party
 People Party
 Independent Azharite conservative front 
 Azhar Scholars Front
 Egyptian Reform Party

References 

Islamism in Egypt
2012 establishments in Egypt
Political party alliances in Egypt